Hakan Hacıbektaşoğlu (born 23 April 1984) is a Turkish professional footballer.

Career

References

External links

:tr:Hakan Hacıbektaşoğlu

1984 births
Living people
Turkish footballers
Süper Lig players
Footballers from Istanbul
Turkey youth international footballers
Association football forwards
Turgutluspor footballers
Fatih Karagümrük S.K. footballers
Pazarspor footballers
Pendikspor footballers
Adanaspor footballers
Alanyaspor footballers
Mardinspor footballers
Ünyespor footballers
Samsunspor footballers
Elazığspor footballers
Göztepe S.K. footballers
Çaykur Rizespor footballers